TalTech Basketball is the basketball team of Tallinn University of Technology based in Tallinn, Estonia. The team plays in the Latvian–Estonian Basketball League. Their home arena is the TalTech Sports Hall.

The team has won eight Estonian Championships and seven Estonian Cups.

History
The game of basketball was first introduced to the Tallinn Tehnikum (predecessor of the Tallinn University of Technology) in 1928. The team's first game was played on 4 February 1928,  in the NMKÜ Sports Hall, with Tallinn Tehnikum beating the visiting University of Tartu team 21–19. Tallinn University of Technology basketball team first played in the top tier Estonian Championship in 1951. Coached by Jaroslav Dudkin, the team emerged as a major force in Estonian basketball in the 1960s. Led by Tõnno Lepmets and Priit Tomson, the team won 6 consecutive Estonian Championships from 1961 to 1966. In 1982, Dudkin retired and was replaced as head coach by August Sokk. In 1984 and 1985, the team led by Tiit Sokk and Margus Metstak won two more Estonian Championship titles. TTÜ began to struggle in the early 1990s as new professional basketball clubs joined the league and following the 1993–94 season, the university team was relegated from the Korvpalli Meistriliiga (KML).

From 1999 to 2002, TTÜ sponsored the KML team TTÜ-A. Le Coq (former BC Tallinn) and from 2002 to 2004, TTÜ/A. Le Coq (former BC Hotronic). TTÜ/A. Le Coq won the Estonian Cup in 2003. In 2004, TTÜ/A. Le Coq folded and TTÜ continued in the I Liiga.

TTÜ returned to the KML in 2006 and finished the 2006–07 season in ninth place. In 2008, TTÜ reached the Estonian Cup final, but were defeated by Kalev/Cramo 90–61. The team finished the 2008–09 regular season in third place. In the playoffs, TTÜ swept Rakvere Tarvas in the quarterfinals and faced Kalev/Cramo in the semifinals, losing the series 0–3. TTÜ defeated Valga in the third place games. In 2011, the team merged with Tallinna Kalev and became TTÜ/Kalev. TTÜ/Kalev finished the 2010–11 season in third place, being eliminated by University of Tartu in the semifinals and beating Rakvere Tarvas in the third place games. The unified team dissolved after the 2010–11 season and both clubs continued separately. TTÜ have won the International Students Basketball League three times, in 2013, 2016 and 2017. In September 2018, the university adopted TalTech as the new short name.

Players

Current roster

Depth chart

Coaches

Jaroslav Dudkin 1951–1982
August Sokk 1982–1986
Andres Liinat 1986–1987
Märt Kermon 1987–1989
Alar Sõnajalg 1989–1992
Mihkel Reinsalu 1992–1993

Alar Sõnajalg 1993–1994
Viktor Viktorov 2002–2005
Priit Vene 2005–2007
Aivar Kuusmaa 2007–2010
Üllar Kerde 2010–2011
Heino Lill 2011–2012

Tiit Sokk 2012–2014
Heino Lill 2014–2015
Rait Käbin 2015–2019
Gert Kullamäe 2019
Kris Killing 2019–2021
Alar Varrak 2021–present

Season by season

Trophies and awards

Trophies
Estonian Championship
Winners (8): 1961, 1962, 1963, 1964, 1965, 1966, 1983–84, 1984–85

Estonian Cup
Winners (7): 1960, 1961, 1962, 1964, 1966, 1967, 1970

Individual awards

KML Best Young Player
Matthias Tass – 2018
Ralf Küttis – 2022

All-KML Team
Bambale Osby – 2011
Kristjan Kitsing – 2016
Toomas Raadik – 2019

References

External links
Official website

Tallinn University of Technology
Basketball teams in Estonia
Sport in Tallinn
Korvpalli Meistriliiga